Jenny Shircore is a British make-up artist. She won the Academy Award for Best Makeup for her work in Elizabeth. She won a British Academy Film Award in 2010 for her work in The Young Victoria.

She was born in India to an Armenian father and a French mother, moving to England at age 10.

Shircore was the hair and make-up artist for My Week with Marilyn and Mary Queen of Scots.

References

External links

Best Makeup Academy Award winners
Best Makeup BAFTA Award winners
British make-up artists
British people of Armenian descent
British people of French descent
Living people
Year of birth missing (living people)